Austrian Canadians are Canadian citizens who are of Austrian ancestry  or Austrian-born people who reside in Canada. According to the 2016 Census there were 207,050 Canadians who claimed either full or partial Austrian ancestry.

Austrian Canadian communities can be found throughout the country but with a higher concentration mainly in Western Canada.

History

In the 17th century, soldiers from Austria settled in New France. Numbers increased following the passing of the Staatsgrundgesetz (constitutional law) in 1867 which allowed free migration from Austria-Hungary for civilians. Emigration to Canada increased throughout the late 19th century and into the early 20th, until this was tightened in 1914 at the onset of World War I.Many immigrants from Austria-Hungary to Canada were interned and used for enslaved labour during World War I. Beginning in 1914, subjects of the Habsburg Crown, especially Ukrainian-speakers from Austrian Galicia, were placed in twenty-four internment camps across Canada, the last of which closed in 1920.

Demographics 
Austrian Canadian population by province and territory in Canada in 2011:

See also  
 Austria–Canada relations
 Greg Holst, head coach
 German Canadians
 Hungarian Canadians
 Swiss Canadians

References 

 

Canada